{{Motorsport season
| series = Ginetta GT4 Supercup
| year = 2021
| footer = 2021 ToCA Support series:2021 BTCC2021 F4 British Championship2021 Ginetta Junior Championship2021 Porsche Carrera Cup GB2021 Mini Challenge UK}}
The 2021 Millers Oils Ginetta GT4 Supercup''' is a multi-event, one make GT motor racing championship held across England and Scotland. The championship features a mix of professional motor racing teams and privately funded drivers, competing in Ginetta G55s that conform to the technical regulations for the championship. It forms part of the extensive program of support categories built up around the BTCC centrepiece. It is the eleventh Ginetta GT4 Supercup, having rebranded from the Ginetta G50 Cup, which ran between 2008 and 2010. The season commenced on 12 June at Snetterton and concludes on 24 October at Brands Hatch, utilising the GP circuit, after twenty-three races held at eight meetings, all in support of the 2021 British Touring Car Championship.

Teams and drivers
For 2021 the amateur class was removed, seeing a return to a two class structure.

Race Calendar

Championship standings

Notes
A driver's best 22 scores counted towards the championship, with any other points being discarded.

Drivers' championships

 Guest entry - not eligible for points

References

External links
 
 Ginetta GT4 Supercup Series News

Ginetta GT4 Supercup
Ginetta GT4 Supercup seasons